Kodyma is a right tributary of the Southern Bug river of Ukraine. Originating from springs in a boggy valley near the village of Budei (:uk:Будеї), Kodyma Raion, Odesa Oblast,  it flows within the Odesa Oblast and Mykolaiv Oblast and joins Southern Buh about 199 km away from its mouth, near Pervomaisk.

Settlements by the river include Balta town, Holma village (:uk:Гольма), Bobrik Pershy ("Bobrik the First", :uk:Бобрик Перший), and Kryve Ozero urban-type settlement ("Crooked Lake").

Notes and references

Rivers of Odesa Oblast
Ottoman Empire–Polish–Lithuanian Commonwealth border

nn:Kodyma